Albert Cleveland Weed was an American ichthyologist, known for expeditions to the Arctic, where he catalogued the region's fish.

Weed was born in North Rose, New York, and earned his bachelor's degree at Cornell University.  

He was hired as assistant curator of the Field Museum of Natural History in 1921.  By his retirement, in 1942, he was serving as full curator of the Fishery department.  

He made multiple scientific field trips to Labrador and Greenland in the 1920s and 1930s.

References

Weed, Alfred Cleveland
Cornell University alumni
American ichthyologists
Explorers of the Arctic